The 2010 IIHF World U18 Championship Division II was an international under-18 ice hockey competition organised by the International Ice Hockey Federation. Both Division II tournaments made up the third level of the IIHF World U18 Championships. The Group A tournament was played in Narva, Estonia, and the Group B tournament was played in Kyiv, Ukraine. Italy and Slovenia won the Group A and B tournaments respectively and gained promotion to the Division I of the 2011 IIHF World U18 Championships.

Group A
The Group A tournament was played in Narva, Estonia, from 13 to 19 March 2010.

Final Standings

 was promoted to Division I for the 2011 IIHF World U18 Championships. was relegated to Division III for the 2011 IIHF World U18 Championships

Results
All times are local (EET - UTC+02:00).

Group B
The Group B tournament was played in Kyiv, Ukraine, from 22 to 28 March 2010.

Final Standings

 was promoted to Division I for the 2011 IIHF World U18 Championships. was relegated to Division III for the 2011 IIHF World U18 Championships

Results
All times are local (EET - UTC+02:00) / 28.03.2010 (EEST - UTC+03:00).

See also
2010 IIHF World U18 Championships
2010 IIHF World U18 Championship Division I
2010 IIHF World U18 Championship Division III

References

IIHF World U18 Championship Division II
II
International ice hockey competitions hosted by Estonia
International ice hockey competitions hosted by Ukraine
2010 in Ukrainian sport
World